The Women's  time trial cycling events at the 2016 Summer Paralympics took place on September 8–11 at  Rio Olympic Velodrome. Three events took place  covering six classifications.

Classification
Cyclists are given a classification depending on the type and extent of their disability. The classification system allows cyclists to compete against others with a similar level of function. The class number indicates the severity of impairment with "1" being most impaired.

Cycling classes for track cycling are:
B: Blind and visually impaired cyclists use a Tandem bicycle with a sighted pilot on the front
C 1-5: Cyclists with an impairment that affects their legs, arms and/or trunk but are capable of using a standard bicycle

Women's time trials

C1-3

C4-5

B

Women's time trial
Para